
Horodok is a city in Lviv Raion, Lviv Oblast (region) of Ukraine. It hosts the administration of Horodok urban hromada, one of the hromadas of Ukraine. Population: .

History
Horodok was first mentioned by Nestor the Chronicler in the Primary Chronicle. The Galician–Volhynian Chronicle mentions that the King Daniel of Galicia came to Horodok with his forces to join Mstislav Mstislavich the Bold while they fought with Polish-Hungarians over the Galician land.

In the mid-14th century, together with whole Kingdom of Rus, the settlement was annexed by the Kingdom of Poland. Its name was changed to Gródek, and it remained in Poland for the next 400 years. In 1372, King Jagiello founded here a Roman Catholic parish. During this reign, Gródek also received Magdeburg rights. This was the place where King of Poland and Grand Duke of Lithuania Jagiello died on 1 June 1434.

Until the Partitions of Poland, Gródek was part of Ruthenian Voivodeship. A battle between Ukrainian Cossack and Polish forces took place here in 1655 (see Battle of Horodok (1655)), in which Ukrainian Cossack Bohdan Khmelnytsky defeated Polish forces and then laid siege to Lviv.

In 1772, Gródek was annexed by the Habsburg Empire, as part of Austrian Galicia, where it remained until late 1918. German-speaking settlers established their own colony, called Vorderberg (1788). Austrian authorities closed local Franciscan monastery, turning it into a military depot. In 1903, a monument to Wladyslaw Jagiello was unveiled here, and in 1906, the name of the town was changed from Gródek to Gródek Jagielloński, in honour of the king. During World War I, Horodok was twice the location of fierce battles: In the Battle of Gródek (1914), the advancing Russian army captured the town from Austria-Hungary, and a year later, a combined German and Austro-Hungarian force fought the Russians in the Battle of Gródek (1915).

In the Second Polish Republic, Gródek was the seat of a county in Lwow Voivodeship. The town had three Roman Catholic churches, one Greek-Catholic, and a synagogue. It also was a military garrison, where a unit of Polish Army’s 5th Infantry Division was stationed. According to the 1921 census, Poles made 72% of the population, Ukrainians 26%, and Jews 2%.

During the Invasion of Poland, Gródek was captured by the Wehrmacht on 13 September 1939, and later taken over by the Red Army.In 1939-1941, Russian-communist repressions continued against the peaceful Ukrainian population of the city, especially against representatives of the Ukrainian intellictuals.  It was then recaptured by the Germans in 1941. At this time, the Jewish population of Gródek was approximately 5,000 people, or 800 families. During the summer of 1942, approximately half of the Jews in Gródek were murdered by the Nazis assisted, in some cases, by their local auxiliaries. The remainder were shot and buried in mass graves on 3 February 1943 in the final liquidation of the Jewish ghetto in the town. Only a few Jews survived the war.

From 1945–1991, Gródek was a part of the Soviet Union, and returned to its historical name of Horodok (Городок). Since 1991 it has been part of Ukraine.

Until 18 July 2020, Horodok was the administrative center of Horodok Raion. The raion was abolished in July 2020 as part of the administrative reform of Ukraine, which reduced the number of raions of Lviv Oblast to seven. The area of Horodok Raion was merged into Lviv Raion.

Churches and Monasteries

Gallery

Religious Buildings in Horodok, Lviv Oblast

People from Horodok

  – Ukrainian politician, envoy to the Polish Sejm in the 1920s and 1930s
 Franciszek Duszeńko – Polish sculptor, rector of Academy of Fine Arts in Gdańsk
 Igor Gorin - American baritone, emigrated to the United States as a teenager
  – Polish radiologist and physician
 Jan Paweł Lenga – Roman Catholic bishop
 Roman Lysko – Ukrainian Greek Catholic priest and martyr
 Ross Martin – American actor, emigrated to the United States as an infant
  (1871–1916), Ukrainian writer, lawyer, and community activist from 1899 to 1903
  – Polish legal expert and law professor
  – Polish architect and politician, envoy to the Sejm
 Dmitry Vergun – publicist, journalist, poet, and historian

International relations

Twin towns — sister cities
Horodok is twinned with:

 Nisko in Poland

Notes

External links
 
 
 Unofficial site
 Gródek Jagielloński (in Polish)

Cities in Lviv Oblast
Lwów Voivodeship
Ruthenian Voivodeship
Shtetls
Cities of district significance in Ukraine